Paul Milford (born 16 May 1976 from Exmouth, Devon) is a professional English professional darts player who plays in the British Darts Organisation events. His occupation is bricklaying.

Career
He won a PDC Challenge Tour event in 2017.
He is representing England in the British Darts Organisation in 2019.

References

External links
Profile and stats on Darts Database

1976 births
Living people
English darts players
People from Exmouth
Sportspeople from Devon